The 2015 Tri-Cities Fever season was the team's eleventh season as a professional indoor football franchise and sixth in the Indoor Football League (IFL). One of ten teams competing in the IFL for the 2015 season, the Kennewick, Washington-based Tri-Cities Fever were members of the Intense Conference.

Under the leadership of owner/general manager Teri Carr and head coach Adam Shackleford, the team played their home games at the Toyota Center in Kennewick, Washington.

Schedule
Key:

Regular season
All start times are local time

Standings

Postseason

Roster

References

External links
Tri-Cities Fever official website
Tri-Cities Fever official statistics
Tri-Cities Fever at Tri-City Herald

Tri-Cities Fever
Tri-Cities Fever seasons
Tri-Cities Fever